Chocenice is a municipality and village in Plzeň-North District in the Plzeň Region of the Czech Republic. It has about 600 inhabitants.

Administrative parts
Villages of Chocenická Lhota, Kotousov and Zhůř are administrative parts of Chocenice.

References

Villages in Plzeň-South District